Quaker Springs is a hamlet in Saratoga County, New York, United States. The zip code is 12871. Quaker Springs is between NY-32 Route 4. Quaker Springs United Methodist Church is located in the hamlet. An anti-slavery society was based in Quaker Springs and several possible participants in the Underground Railroad were in Quaker Springs. The name Quaker Springs came from a type of mineral spring located in the area. The area including Quaker Springs was involved in Revolutionary War positions.

See also

Schuylerville
Saratoga Springs

References

Hamlets in Saratoga County, New York
Hamlets in New York (state)